North West Norfolk is a constituency represented in the House of Commons of the UK Parliament since 2019 by James Wild, a Conservative.

History
Under the Redistribution of Seats Act 1885, the three two-member county divisions of Norfolk were replaced with six single-member divisions, including the newly created North-Western Division of Norfolk, largely formed from parts of the abolished Western Division. It was abolished at the next redistribution of seats under the provisions of the Representation of the People Act 1918, when it was largely absorbed by the expanded county constituency of King's Lynn. It was re-established for the February 1974 general election, replacing the abolished King's Lynn constituency.

The first MP in the re-established constituency was Christopher Brocklebank-Fowler, who had gained King's Lynn, largely a bellwether seat, from one of Harold Wilson's government colleagues in the Labour Party. He therefore effectively held the seat in the two 1974 elections, and in 1979; however, by March 1981, he became distanced from the Conservatives and defected to the newly formed Social Democratic Party shortly before the 1983 Conservative landslide, in which Brocklebank-Fowler lost his seat to the replacement Conservative candidate Henry Bellingham.

Bellingham increased his precarious lead over Brocklebank-Fowler at the 1987 general election. Therefore, at the following election, Brocklebank-Fowler chose to contest another area and Labour's candidate regained second place in this constituency, almost doubling their share of the vote. Labour gained the seat at the 1997 general election; however, Bellingham regained the seat at the 2001 general election and subsequently increased his majority in both 2005 and 2010. His majority fell slightly in 2015, but he retained the seat in the 2017 general election with 60% of the vote, having been knighted in the New Year's honours list of 2016.
 
The 2010 election saw political party infighting when the Labour candidate for North West Norfolk, Manish Sood stated in an interview with the local newspaper Lynn News that Gordon Brown was  This gained national attention and resulted in Labour disowning their candidate. Sood did not attend the count and stated he would watch it from his home in Leicester. He ended up finishing third, behind Bellingham and the Liberal Democrat candidate William Summers, whose party received their best ever result in the constituency, with an 18.3% swing from Labour to the others.

Constituency profile 
Norfolk North West constituency covers an extensive hinterland in the far corner of East Anglia - remote from London, but close to Lincolnshire and the East Midlands, with which the area shares more economic links.

A minority of King's Lynn contain severe poverty marked by unemployment, social housing dependency and social problems - within  relatively affluent East Anglia, only Jaywick and Great Yarmouth from 2001 to 2004 scored higher in deprivation indices.  Contrasted with this is the bulk of the area: the tourist resort Hunstanton, retail, military, public sector and commercial activity of Kings Lynn and the royal estate at Sandringham, along with many small villages and more than 50% undulating cultivated farmland — incomes and types of dwelling are close to the national average.  The most frequent result has been of a fairly marginal but not negligible majority for a Conservative, who have won it 8 out of the last 9 general elections.

Labour's share of the vote fell from a winning 43.8% in the 1997 election to just 13.3% in 2010, marking the steepest decline from the start to end of the thirteen years of Labour government.

Boundaries and boundary changes

1885–1918: The Municipal Borough of King's Lynn, and the Sessional Divisions of Brothercross, Freebridge Lynn, Freebridge Marshall, and Gallow and Smithdon.

As King's Lynn formed a separate Parliamentary Borough, only non-resident freeholders of the Borough were entitled to vote in this constituency.

On abolition, the bulk of the Division was amalgamated with the abolished Parliamentary Borough of King's Lynn to form the new King's Lynn Division of Norfolk.  Eastern areas, including Fakenham, were transferred to the Northern Division.

1974–1983: The Municipal Borough of King's Lynn, the Urban Districts of Hunstanton and Wells-next-the-Sea, and the Rural Districts of Docking, Freebridge Lynn, Marshland, and Walsingham.

The re-established constituency was formed from the abolished county constituency of King's Lynn with the addition of Wells-next-the-Sea and the Rural District of Walsingham, which included Fakenham, transferred from North Norfolk.  This area is currently in the constituencies of North Norfolk and Broadland.

1983–2010: The Borough of King's Lynn and West Norfolk wards of Burnham, Chase, Clenchwarton, Creake, Dersingham, Docking, Gayton, Gaywood Central, Gaywood North, Gaywood South, Grimston, Heacham, Hunstanton, Lynn Central, Lynn North, Lynn South West, Mershe Lande, Middleton, North Coast, Priory, Rudham, St Lawrence, St Margaret's, Snettisham, Spellowfields, The Walpoles, The Woottons, Valley Hill, West Walton, West Winch, and Wiggenhall.

Wells-next-the-Sea and areas comprising the former Rural District of Walsingham, including Fakenham, were transferred back to North Norfolk.  Minor realignment of the boundary with South West Norfolk.

2010–present: The Borough of King's Lynn and West Norfolk wards of Brancaster, Burnham, Clenchwarton, Dersingham, Docking, Fairstead, Gayton, Gaywood Chase, Gaywood North Bank, Grimston, Heacham, Hunstanton, North Lynn, North Wootton, Old Gaywood, Priory, Rudham, St Margaret's with St Nicholas, Snettisham, South and West Lynn, South Wootton, Spellowfields, Springwood, Valley Hill, Walpole, and West Winch.

Small area transferred to South West Norfolk.

The present constituency includes two former Parliamentary Boroughs, those of Castle Rising, which was abolished as a 'rotten borough' in 1832, and King's Lynn, abolished in 1918.

Members of Parliament

MPs 1885–1918

MPs since 1974

Elections

Elections in the 2010s

Elections in the 2000s

Elections in the 1990s

Elections in the 1980s

Elections in the 1970s

Elections in the 1910s

Elections in the 1900s

Elections in the 1890s

Elections in the 1880s

See also
 List of parliamentary constituencies in Norfolk

Notes

References

Parliamentary constituencies in Norfolk
Constituencies of the Parliament of the United Kingdom established in 1885
Constituencies of the Parliament of the United Kingdom disestablished in 1918
Constituencies of the Parliament of the United Kingdom established in 1974